Randy P. Kamrath (born May 23, 1954) was an American politician and a farmer.

Kamrath was born in Canby, Yellow Medicine County, Minnesota. Kamrath went to University of Minnesota. He lived in Canby, Minnesota with his wife Susan (née Dosland) and their family and was a farmer. Kamrath served in the Minnesota Senate from 1981 to 1986 and was a Republican. His wife's father William B. Dosland also served in the Minnesota Legislature.

References

1954 births
Living people
People from Yellow Medicine County, Minnesota
University of Minnesota alumni
Farmers from Minnesota
Republican Party Minnesota state senators